Novosyolka is a rural locality (a selo) in Andreyevskoye Rural Settlement, Alexandrovsky District, Vladimir Oblast, Russia. The population was 147 as of 2010. There are 3 streets.

Geography 
The village is located 7 km south-east from Andreyevskoye.

References 

Rural localities in Alexandrovsky District, Vladimir Oblast
Alexandrovsky Uyezd (Vladimir Governorate)